Sons of the Desert was an American country music band founded in 1989 in Waco, Texas. Its most famous lineup consisted of brothers Drew Womack (lead vocals) and Tim Womack (lead guitar, background vocals), along with Scott Saunders (keyboards), Doug Virden (bass guitar, background vocals), and Brian Westrum (drums). The band released Whatever Comes First for Epic Records Nashville in 1997, and recorded a second album for Epic which was not released. Change followed in 2000. Counting two singles from the unreleased album, Sons of the Desert charted eight times on the Billboard Hot Country Songs charts, including the top ten hit "Whatever Comes First"; they were also guest vocalists on Lee Ann Womack's 2000 hit "I Hope You Dance" and Ty Herndon's "It Must Be Love", both of which reached No. 1 on that chart. Following the band's disestablishment, Drew Womack became a solo artist; he would join Lonestar in 2021.

Biography
The band, deriving its name from the 1933 Laurel and Hardy film Sons of the Desert, was founded in 1989 by a group of students attending McLennan Community College in Waco, Texas. The original members included Doug Virden, Jim Beavers, Troy Von Haefen, Kyle Mathis, and Curtis Beck.

First album
In 1997, Sons of the Desert signed to Epic Records' Nashville division. The band's debut album, Whatever Comes First, was released that year. Its title track served as the lead-off single, reaching a peak of No. 10 on the Billboard Hot Country Singles & Tracks charts. The album's second and third singles, "Hand of Fate" and "Leaving October" (which Drew Womack wrote about his third-grade teacher), also reached top 40 on the same chart. Drew Womack and Virden also appeared as studio backing vocalists for other Epic Records artists, including Ty Herndon's 1996 album Living in a Moment and 1998 album Big Hopes, as well as Joe Diffie's 1997 album Twice Upon a Time. Drew Womack also wrote Kenny Chesney's 1997 single "She's Got It All".

"Goodbye Earl"
Following the release of its first album, Sons of the Desert discovered a song called "Goodbye Earl", which they began to perform in concert. Written by Dennis Linde, "Goodbye Earl" told of a domestic abuse victim who enlisted a friend's help to kill her abusive husband. The group then recorded the song for a planned second album on Epic. Shortly after the Dixie Chicks (who were signed to Monument Records, which like Epic, was a division of Sony Music Entertainment), recorded the song, and they were planning to include it on their next album as well. Although both bands had planned to release their versions as singles, the Dixie Chicks claimed the song as their own. Their version was recorded on their 1999 album Fly, and released as a single in 2000.

Sons of the Desert then entered a dispute with Sony over "Goodbye Earl", resulting in the band's departure from the label. Their second album for Epic was not released, and Sony acquired the rights to all of that album's songs (including the single "What About You", which had been released and peaked at number 45 on the country charts). Also included on this unreleased album was a recording of "Bless the Broken Road", a song which was previously a number 42 country single in 1997 for Melodie Crittenden, and would later become a No. 1 country hit when the group Rascal Flatts recorded it for their 2004 album Feels Like Today. "Albuquerque" was issued as the unreleased album's second single, peaking at No. 58. The band was also featured on Ty Herndon's 1998 hit "It Must Be Love".

Switch to MCA Nashville, breakup, and solo projects
Sons of the Desert signed to MCA Nashville Records in October 1999. The band's first album for MCA, titled Change, was released a year later. The label also shifted the band's focus to just the Womack brothers and Virden. Saunders and Westrum still performed with the band, but were no longer considered official members; further, Westrum did not perform on Change, with session drummer Steve Brewster contributing in his place. The album also featured Keith Urban playing banjo on the track "Ride". The title track served as the first single from Change, followed by "Everybody's Gotta Grow Up Sometime." These songs peaked outside the country top 40.

Following "Everybody's Gotta Grow Up Sometime," Sons of the Desert appeared as guest vocalists on Lee Ann Womack's 2000 single "I Hope You Dance", which went to No. 1 on the country charts (Lee Ann is not related to the Womack brothers). The band's final chart single, "What I Did Right", was released after "I Hope You Dance," and it reached a peak of No. 22 on the country charts in 2001. At the end of the year, Virden left the group, reducing Sons of the Desert to a duo with the Womack brothers in the lineup.

Sons of the Desert exited the label and broke up. Drew Womack recorded a solo album for Smith Music Group in 2003 which featured several contributions from the band's other members, and a re-recording of "Leaving October". In 2012, Womack released his first solo album in nearly a decade, Sunshine to Rain, following surgery to rebuild a vertebra in his spine. The album is a significant musical departure from his previous work.

In March 2021, Womack succeeded Richie McDonald as the lead vocalist of Lonestar, while McDonald focused more on his (already ongoing) responsibilities as part of The Frontmen of Country, which also consists of Tim Rushlow and Larry Stewart, the former and current lead vocalists of Little Texas and Restless Heart, respectively.

Discography

Studio albums

Singles

Guest singles

ADid not enter the Hot 100, but peaked at number 16 on Bubbling Under Hot 100 Singles.

Music videos

References

External
Drew Womack official website

Country music groups from Texas
Epic Records artists
MCA Records artists
Musical groups established in 1989
Musical groups from Waco, Texas
Musical groups disestablished in 2004